The college football rivalry between the University of Connecticut and the University of Rhode Island dates back to the 1890s and was born largely out of proximity, with the schools being less than 60 miles apart. The schools competed in all sports for decades as members of the Yankee Conference. Even though UConn became a charter member of the Big East in 1979, the schools continued to compete in football at the I-AA level as members of the Atlantic 10. The yearly games ended after UConn left the A-10 to move to I-A football in 2000.

Series facts & figures
In 94 meetings since 1897, UConn leads the series 52–34–8. The schools met at Rentschler Field on September 26, 2009, with UConn winning 52–10. The two teams last met in East Hartford in 2018, where UConn won 56–49.

Ramnapping Trophy
The Ramnapping Trophy was formerly awarded to the winner of the annual football game between the two schools. The name of the trophy originates from a 1930s-era tradition where a few UConn students would go to the URI campus and kidnap (or in this case, "Ramnap") the Rhode Island Ram mascot.

The trophy is topped with a football player standing on a football that is etched with a ram and a husky etched facing one another on a football field. The plaque on the base reads: "Connecticut State v. Rhode Island State Football Series Trophy in Memory of the famous ramnapping of 1934".

The Ramnapping Trophy is on display to the public as part of the J. Robert Donnelly Husky Heritage Sports Museum on the UConn Main Campus in Storrs, Connecticut. The trophy was last brought out during the 1999 game.

Game results

 † By forfeit

See also  
 List of NCAA college football rivalry games

References

College football rivalries in the United States
Rhode Island Rams football
UConn Huskies football